Amity International School is a group of school in India.

Amity International School may also refer to:

 Amity International School, Erasmia, South Africa
 Amity International School, Gurgaon, Haryana, India
 Amity International School Vasundhara, Uttar Pradesh, India

See also
 Amity School
 Amity High School (disambiguation)